Parishan (also Romanized as Parīshān) is a village in Famur Rural District, Jereh and Baladeh District, Kazerun County, Fars Province, Iran. At the 2006 census, its population was 89, in 21 families.

References 

Populated places in Kazerun County